David Henry Lewis Jr. (August 5, 1918 - May 15, 2002) was an American prelate who served as the Suffragan Bishop of Virginia from 1980 till 1987.

Early life and education
Lewis was born in South Boston, Virginia on August 5, 1918, the son of Reverend David Henry Lewis and Louise Thornton Owen. He studied at the University of Virginia from where he graduated in 1939 and proceeded for further studies at the Virginia Theological Seminary from where he graduated in 1942.

Ordination
Lewis was ordained deacon in 1942 and then priest on April 9, 1943, at Abingdon Church in White Marsh, Virginia by Bishop Frederick D. Goodwin.  He then served as rector of Abingdon Church, Christchurch, Virginia and St Stephen's Church in Culpeper, Virginia. In 1956 he became rector of St Matthew's Church in Richmond, Virginia.

Bishop
Lewis was elected Suffragan Bishop of Virginia on October 6, 1979, on the fourth ballot of a special convention. He was consecrated on February 3, 1980, in St Paul's Church, Richmond, Virginia by Presiding Bishop John Allin.  Lewis retired in 1987.

References

1918 births
2002 deaths
20th-century American Episcopalians
Episcopal bishops of Virginia
20th-century American clergy